Rivers Henderson Buford (January 18, 1878 – March 17, 1959) was an American attorney and politician who served twice as the chief justice of the Florida Supreme Court.

Early life and education 
Buford was born on January 18, 1878, in Pulaski, Tennessee. Through his mother, Martha Bolling Rivers, Buford is a direct descendant of Pocahontas. Buford lived in Pulaski until 1882, when his father moved the family to Wewahitchka, Florida, at the time in Calhoun County, in order to take a surveying position.

Buford did not have a formal education, instead taking occupation as a lumberer, until 1894, when he moved to Tallahassee, Florida, to read law under attorney Fred T. Myers. Buford was admitted to the Florida Bar in 1900, and he began a private law practice in Blountstown, Florida, the same year.

Political career 
In 1901, Buford, still a practicing attorney, was elected to represent Calhoun County in the Florida House of Representatives. He served in this position until 1902, when he moved to Marianna, Florida, in neighboring Jackson County, where he continued his law practice.

In 1909, Florida Governor Albert W. Gilchrist appointed Buford as the prosecuting attorney for nearby Gadsden County, a position he served in until 1911 when he returned to Marianna. In 1912, Buford was elected as the state attorney for Florida's Ninth Judicial Circuit. The circuit court was split up in 1915, and Buford continued to serve as the state attorney, now for the Fourteenth Judicial Circuit.

Florida Attorney General 
In 1920, Buford was elected as the 22nd Florida Attorney General, overseeing a tumultuous period in Floridian law. As a result of World War I cutting off vacation access to the French Rivera, Miami, Florida, was propped up as an alternative due to its similar Mediterranean climate. This led to a land boom, in which numerous planned communities in South Florida, such as Coral Gables and Boca Raton, were created.

As a result of the success brought to South Florida as a result of the land boom, many of the wealthy tourists were at odds with Florida's prohibition laws, put in place by Buford's predecessor Van C. Swearingen. It was particularly difficult to enforce prohibition in South Florida due to rum runners operating out of nearby Cuba and The Bahamas. These rum runners often had the support of the wealthy Northern tourists who frequented Miami in the summer.

While South Florida was prospering during Buford's tenure, the same could not be said for North Florida and Central Florida, both of which struggled with increased racial tensions and the rise of the Second Ku Klux Klan. Buford turned a blind eye to the lynchings and burnings that occurred during the Perry race riot and the Rosewood massacre. Additionally, he chose not to investigate the Ocoee massacre, which occurred at the end of Swearingen's term.

Buford also did little to stop the abuse of migrant workers, who worked for only a few dollars a week in the tropical sun. These workers were housed in derelict company towns, which often lacked schools and hospitals. These company towns also gave way to the rise of jook-joints, dance halls which were usually the only form of recreation in those towns.

In 1925, Buford, with the aid of the United States Coast Guard, heavily restricted the ability for rum runners to safely operate in South Florida. This, coupled with devastating hurricanes and high land prices, led to a real estate market crash, wherein no new customers were arriving, and current landowners were being forced to sell their land for little profit.

Florida Supreme Court 
Despite Buford's disastrous reputation in hindsight, at the time he remained a popular figure in Floridian political circles, culminating in his appointment to the Florida Supreme Court on December 4, 1925, by Governor John W. Martin. While on the court, Buford was twice elected Chief Justice, serving from 1931 until 1933, and from 1943 until 1945.

Buford was noted for his colorful personality, and he was praised as one of the court's finest minds. Widely admired for his skill as a public speaker, Buford holds the record for the most opinions published in the Florida Supreme Court, having delivered 2,657 different opinions.

Buford, swearing he would never wear a black robe, retired from the court on April 3, 1948, shortly before the robes were introduced. He pursued real estate in Tallahassee after his retirement.

Personal life and death 
Buford initially married a woman named Nora Lee Milliken. They had no children. He later married Mary Cornelia Munroe, the daughter of a physician from Quincy, Florida. Buford and Munroe had five children together: Rivers Henderson, Jr., Martha Hauze, Maxine Frances, Alice Dismukes, and Albert Lewis, though Rivers Henderson Buford, Jr. did not survive childbirth.

After Munroe's death in 1924, Buford married Mary Hollingsworth. They only had one child together, also named Rivers Henderson Buford, Jr., in 1927. The young Buford would go on to become a successful attorney, dying in 2016.

Buford was a Freemason, and was a member of the Morocco Temple in Jacksonville, Florida.

Buford died in Tallahassee on March 17, 1959. He is buried in Quincy's Western Cemetery.

References

Justices of the Florida Supreme Court
1878 births
1959 deaths
People from Pulaski, Tennessee
U.S. state supreme court judges admitted to the practice of law by reading law
Florida Attorneys General
20th-century American politicians
Democratic Party members of the Florida House of Representatives
People from Wewahitchka, Florida
People from Blountstown, Florida
People from Marianna, Florida
People from Tallahassee, Florida
American Freemasons
Prohibition in the United States
Chief Justices of the Florida Supreme Court